In the field of user interfaces, an exocentric environment refers to a virtual reality or some other immersive environment which completely encompasses the user, e.g. by placing the viewer in a room made up entirely of rear projection screens.

Systems which merely display a virtual reality directly to the user (e.g. using a head-mounted display) do not qualify. They are endocentric environments.

References

User interfaces